The 1976–77 Philadelphia Flyers season was the Philadelphia Flyers' tenth season in the National Hockey League (NHL). They finished first in the Patrick Division with a record of 48 wins, 16 losses, and 16 ties for 112 points.

Regular season
Dethroned, the heyday of the Broad Street Bullies came to an end, as prior to the 1976–77 season, tough-guy Dave Schultz was traded to the Los Angeles Kings. Despite a slight drop-off in performance, the Flyers dominated the Patrick Division with what proved to be their 4th straight division title.

Season standings

Playoffs
After disposing of Toronto—after which series Toronto coach Red Kelly claimed "I don't think I'd call [Bobby] Clarke dirty—mean is a better word"—in six games, the Flyers found themselves in the semifinals for the fifth consecutive season. Pitted against Boston, the Flyers lost Games 1 and 2 at home in overtime and would not return home as they were swept in four straight games.

Schedule and results

Regular season

|- style="background:#fcf;"
| 1 || October 7 || New York Islanders || 0–3 || 0–1–0 || 0 || 
|- style="background:#fcf;"
| 2 || October 9 || @ Atlanta Flames || 3–4 || 0–2–0 || 0 || 
|- style="background:#cfc;"
| 3 || October 10 || Los Angeles Kings || 1–0 || 1–2–0 || 2 || 
|- style="background:#fcf;"
| 4 || October 14 || Montreal Canadiens || 1–7 || 1–3–0 || 2 || 
|- style="background:#ffc;"
| 5 || October 16 || @ Toronto Maple Leafs || 5–5 || 1–3–1 || 3 || 
|- style="background:#cfc;"
| 6 || October 17 || Detroit Red Wings || 7–4 || 2–3–1 || 5 || 
|- style="background:#cfc;"
| 7 || October 21 || Chicago Black Hawks || 5–1 || 3–3–1 || 7 || 
|- style="background:#cfc;"
| 8 || October 23 || Buffalo Sabres || 3–2 || 4–3–1 || 9 || 
|- style="background:#cfc;"
| 9 || October 24 || Colorado Rockies || 5–3 || 5–3–1 || 11 || 
|- style="background:#cfc;"
| 10 || October 28 || Pittsburgh Penguins || 3–0 || 6–3–1 || 13 || 
|- style="background:#ffc;"
| 11 || October 30 || @ New York Islanders || 3–3 || 6–3–2 || 14 || 
|- style="background:#cfc;"
| 12 || October 31 || Minnesota North Stars || 9–1 || 7–3–2 || 16 || 
|-

|- style="background:#fcf;"
| 13 || November 4 || @ Detroit Red Wings || 2–3 || 7–4–2 || 16 || 
|- style="background:#fcf;"
| 14 || November 5 || @ Cleveland Barons || 4–6 || 7–5–2 || 16 || 
|- style="background:#fcf;"
| 15 || November 7 || @ Buffalo Sabres || 3–5 || 7–6–2 || 16 || 
|- style="background:#ffc;"
| 16 || November 10 || @ Chicago Black Hawks || 2–2 || 7–6–3 || 17 || 
|- style="background:#cfc;"
| 17 || November 11 || Vancouver Canucks || 6–4 || 8–6–3 || 19 || 
|- style="background:#fcf;"
| 18 || November 13 || @ Pittsburgh Penguins || 0–1 || 8–7–3 || 19 || 
|- style="background:#cfc;"
| 19 || November 16 || Detroit Red Wings || 2–0 || 9–7–3 || 21 || 
|- style="background:#cfc;"
| 20 || November 21 || Atlanta Flames || 6–5 || 10–7–3 || 23 || 
|- style="background:#ffc;"
| 21 || November 24 || New York Rangers || 2–2 || 10–7–4 || 24 || 
|- style="background:#cfc;"
| 22 || November 26 || @ Colorado Rockies || 4–2 || 11–7–4 || 26 || 
|- style="background:#cfc;"
| 23 || November 28 || New York Islanders || 5–3 || 12–7–4 || 28 || 
|-

|- style="background:#ffc;"
| 24 || December 1 || @ Minnesota North Stars || 2–2 || 12–7–5 || 29 || 
|- style="background:#ffc;"
| 25 || December 3 || @ Washington Capitals || 4–4 || 12–7–6 || 30 || 
|- style="background:#cfc;"
| 26 || December 5 || Cleveland Barons || 6–2 || 13–7–6 || 32 || 
|- style="background:#cfc;"
| 27 || December 9 || @ Boston Bruins || 3–1 || 14–7–6 || 34 || 
|- style="background:#cfc;"
| 28 || December 11 || Boston Bruins || 4–3 || 15–7–6 || 36 || 
|- style="background:#cfc;"
| 29 || December 12 || Toronto Maple Leafs || 7–4 || 16–7–6 || 38 || 
|- style="background:#ffc;"
| 30 || December 14 || @ Minnesota North Stars || 3–3 || 16–7–7 || 39 || 
|- style="background:#cfc;"
| 31 || December 16 || Chicago Black Hawks || 4–1 || 17–7–7 || 41 || 
|- style="background:#cfc;"
| 32 || December 18 || @ St. Louis Blues || 2–0 || 18–7–7 || 43 || 
|- style="background:#cfc;"
| 33 || December 19 || Colorado Rockies || 4–3 || 19–7–7 || 45 || 
|- style="background:#ffc;"
| 34 || December 22 || @ New York Rangers || 3–3 || 19–7–8 || 46 || 
|- style="background:#cfc;"
| 35 || December 23 || Washington Capitals || 5–2 || 20–7–8 || 48 || 
|- style="background:#cfc;"
| 36 || December 27 || @ Vancouver Canucks || 5–1 || 21–7–8 || 50 || 
|- style="background:#cfc;"
| 37 || December 30 || @ Los Angeles Kings || 2–0 || 22–7–8 || 52 || 
|-

|- style="background:#cfc;"
| 38 || January 1 || @ Cleveland Barons || 7–2 || 23–7–8 || 54 || 
|- style="background:#fcf;"
| 39 || January 3 || @ Montreal Canadiens || 4–6 || 23–8–8 || 54 || 
|- style="background:#ffc;"
| 40 || January 5 || @ New York Rangers || 4–4 || 23–8–9 || 55 || 
|- style="background:#cfc;"
| 41 || January 6 || St. Louis Blues || 7–1 || 24–8–9 || 57 || 
|- style="background:#cfc;"
| 42 || January 8 || Los Angeles Kings || 6–1 || 25–8–9 || 59 || 
|- style="background:#fcf;"
| 43 || January 10 || @ New York Islanders || 3–8 || 25–9–9 || 59 || 
|- style="background:#cfc;"
| 44 || January 15 || Colorado Rockies || 5–2 || 26–9–9 || 61 || 
|- style="background:#cfc;"
| 45 || January 16 || Minnesota North Stars || 4–2 || 27–9–9 || 63 || 
|- style="background:#fcf;"
| 46 || January 20 || Montreal Canadiens || 2–6 || 27–10–9 || 63 || 
|- style="background:#ffc;"
| 47 || January 22 || @ Atlanta Flames || 4–4 || 27–10–10 || 64 || 
|- style="background:#ffc;"
| 48 || January 23 || @ Chicago Black Hawks || 2–2 || 27–10–11 || 65 || 
|- style="background:#cfc;"
| 49 || January 27 || @ St. Louis Blues || 2–0 || 28–10–11 || 67 || 
|- style="background:#cfc;"
| 50 || January 29 || @ Pittsburgh Penguins || 5–2 || 29–10–11 || 69 || 
|- style="background:#ffc;"
| 51 || January 30 || @ Washington Capitals || 5–5 || 29–10–12 || 70 || 
|-

|- style="background:#cfc;"
| 52 || February 3 || Chicago Black Hawks || 6–0 || 30–10–12 || 72 || 
|- style="background:#cfc;"
| 53 || February 5 || @ Toronto Maple Leafs || 7–5 || 31–10–12 || 74 || 
|- style="background:#cfc;"
| 54 || February 7 || Atlanta Flames || 7–4 || 32–10–12 || 76 || 
|- style="background:#cfc;"
| 55 || February 10 || Washington Capitals || 9–2 || 33–10–12 || 78 || 
|- style="background:#fcf;"
| 56 || February 12 || @ New York Islanders || 1–2 || 33–11–12 || 78 || 
|- style="background:#cfc;"
| 57 || February 14 || St. Louis Blues || 6–4 || 34–11–12 || 80 || 
|- style="background:#cfc;"
| 58 || February 17 || New York Rangers || 7–1 || 35–11–12 || 82 || 
|- style="background:#fcf;"
| 59 || February 19 || @ Montreal Canadiens || 2–5 || 35–12–12 || 82 || 
|- style="background:#cfc;"
| 60 || February 20 || Buffalo Sabres || 4–2 || 36–12–12 || 84 || 
|- style="background:#fcf;"
| 61 || February 24 || @ Buffalo Sabres || 0–2 || 36–13–12 || 84 || 
|- style="background:#cfc;"
| 62 || February 26 || @ St. Louis Blues || 5–1 || 37–13–12 || 86 || 
|- style="background:#cfc;"
| 63 || February 27 || @ Colorado Rockies || 4–3 || 38–13–12 || 88 || 
|-

|- style="background:#cfc;"
| 64 || March 1 || @ Minnesota North Stars || 5–2 || 39–13–12 || 90 || 
|- style="background:#cfc;"
| 65 || March 3 || Vancouver Canucks || 5–2 || 40–13–12 || 92 || 
|- style="background:#cfc;"
| 66 || March 5 || @ Detroit Red Wings || 4–1 || 41–13–12 || 94 || 
|- style="background:#fcf;"
| 67 || March 7 || Toronto Maple Leafs || 2–4 || 41–14–12 || 94 || 
|- style="background:#cfc;"
| 68 || March 10 || Cleveland Barons || 7–2 || 42–14–12 || 96 || 
|- style="background:#fcf;"
| 69 || March 12 || Boston Bruins || 1–3 || 42–15–12 || 96 || 
|- style="background:#cfc;"
| 70 || March 13 || Pittsburgh Penguins || 4–0 || 43–15–12 || 98 || 
|- style="background:#ffc;"
| 71 || March 16 || @ New York Rangers || 4–4 || 43–15–13 || 99 || 
|- style="background:#fcf;"
| 72 || March 17 || Atlanta Flames || 1–4 || 43–16–13 || 99 || 
|- style="background:#cfc;"
| 73 || March 19 || @ Los Angeles Kings || 5–3 || 44–16–13 || 101 || 
|- style="background:#ffc;"
| 74 || March 22 || @ Vancouver Canucks || 4–4 || 44–16–14 || 102 || 
|- style="background:#cfc;"
| 75 || March 24 || @ Boston Bruins || 6–2 || 45–16–14 || 104 || 
|- style="background:#cfc;"
| 76 || March 26 || Vancouver Canucks || 9–3 || 46–16–14 || 106 || 
|- style="background:#cfc;"
| 77 || March 29 || New York Islanders || 3–1 || 47–16–14 || 108 || 
|- style="background:#ffc;"
| 78 || March 30 || @ Cleveland Barons || 3–3 || 47–16–15 || 109 || 
|-

|- style="background:#cfc;"
| 79 || April 2 || New York Rangers || 4–1 || 48–16–15 || 111 || 
|- style="background:#ffc;"
| 80 || April 3 || @ Atlanta Flames || 3–3 || 48–16–16 || 112 || 
|-

|-
| Legend:

Playoffs

|- style="background:#fcf;"
| 1 || April 11 || Toronto Maple Leafs || 2–3 || Maple Leafs lead 1–0 || 
|- style="background:#fcf;"
| 2 || April 13 || Toronto Maple Leafs || 1–4 || Maple Leafs lead 2–0 || 
|- style="background:#cfc;"
| 3 || April 15 || @ Toronto Maple Leafs || 4–3 OT || Maple Leafs lead 2–1 || 
|- style="background:#cfc;"
| 4 || April 17 || @ Toronto Maple Leafs || 6–5 OT || Series tied 2–2 || 
|- style="background:#cfc;"
| 5 || April 19 || Toronto Maple Leafs || 2–0 || Flyers lead 3–2 || 
|- style="background:#cfc;"
| 6 || April 21 || @ Toronto Maple Leafs || 4–3 || Flyers win 4–2 || 
|-

|- style="background:#fcf;"
| 1 || April 24 || Boston Bruins || 3–4 OT || Bruins lead 1–0 || 
|- style="background:#fcf;"
| 2 || April 26 || Boston Bruins || 4–5 2OT || Bruins lead 2–0 || 
|- style="background:#fcf;"
| 3 || April 28 || @ Boston Bruins || 1–2 || Bruins lead 3–0 || 
|- style="background:#fcf;"
| 4 || May 1 || @ Boston Bruins || 0–3 || Bruins win 4–0 || 
|-

|-
| Legend:

Player statistics

Scoring
 Position abbreviations: C = Center; D = Defense; G = Goaltender; LW = Left Wing; RW = Right Wing
  = Joined team via a transaction (e.g., trade, waivers, signing) during the season. Stats reflect time with the Flyers only.
  = Left team via a transaction (e.g., trade, waivers, release) during the season. Stats reflect time with the Flyers only.

Goaltending

Awards and records

Awards

Records

Among the records set during the 1976–77 season was rookie Al Hill setting the league record for most points by a player in his NHL debut, scoring two goals and three assists on February 14 against the St. Louis Blues. The Flyers set a league record for most road ties in a season (15) and a team record for fewest home ties (1). During the playoffs, Rick MacLeish tied a team record for most assists during a single period (3) on April 24. Two days later the Flyers played the longest home game in team history (90 minutes and 7 seconds), losing 5–4 to the Boston Bruins midway through the second overtime period.

Transactions
The Flyers were involved in the following transactions from May 17, 1976, the day after the deciding game of the 1976 Stanley Cup Finals, through May 14, 1977, the day of the deciding game of the 1977 Stanley Cup Finals.

Trades

Players acquired

Players lost

Signings

Draft picks

Philadelphia's picks at the 1976 NHL Amateur Draft, which was held at the NHL's office in Montreal, Quebec, on June 1, 1976.

Farm teams
The Flyers were affiliated with the Springfield Indians of the AHL and the Philadelphia Firebirds of the NAHL.

Notes

References
General
 
 
 
Specific

Philadelphia Flyers seasons
Philadelphia
Philadelphia
Patrick Division champion seasons
Western Conference (NHL) championship seasons
Philad
Philad